In enzymology, a dolichyl-phosphate-mannose-protein mannosyltransferase is an enzyme that catalyzes the chemical reaction

dolichyl phosphate D-mannose + protein  dolichyl phosphate + O-D-mannosylprotein

Thus, the two substrates of this enzyme are dolichyl phosphate D-mannose and protein, whereas its two products are dolichyl phosphate and O-D-mannosylprotein.

This enzyme belongs to the family of glycosyltransferases, specifically the hexosyltransferases. The systematic name of this enzyme class is dolichyl-phosphate-D-mannose:protein O-D-mannosyltransferase. Other names in common use include dolichol phosphomannose-protein mannosyltransferase, and protein O-D-mannosyltransferase. A human gene that codes for this enzyme is POMT1.

References

 
 

EC 2.4.1
Enzymes of unknown structure